Theresa Benedicta of Bavaria (Theresa Benedikta Maria; 6 December 1725 – 29 March 1743) was a Princess of Bavaria.

Biography
Theresa Benedicta was the third child of Charles Albert, Elector of Bavaria and Holy Roman Emperor. Her mother, Maria Amalia, was an Archduchess of Austria by birth. Her maternal grand parents were Joseph I, Holy Roman Emperor, and Wilhelmina Amalia of Brunswick-Lüneburg. Her paternal grand parents were Maximilian II Emanuel, Elector of Bavaria, and Theresa Kunegunda Sobieska, the daughter of the King of Polish–Lithuanian Commonwealth, John III Sobieski. Theresa's mother, Archduchess Maria Amalia, was also a first cousin of Empress Maria Theresa.

Her mother gave birth to seven children, only four of whom lived through to adulthood. Theresa Benedicta's siblings included her brother Maximilian III, Elector of Bavaria, and two sisters Maria Antonia, Electress of Saxony, and Maria Anna Josepha, Margravine of Baden-Baden.

She died on 29 March 1743 in Frankfurt at age 17 of either smallpox or chicken pox.

Ancestry

References

1725 births
1743 deaths
18th-century German people
18th-century German women
Theresa Benedicta
Nobility from Munich
Daughters of emperors
Burials at St. Michael's Church, Munich
Children of Charles VII, Holy Roman Emperor
Deaths from smallpox
Daughters of kings